Rasul Douglas (born August 29, 1995) is an American football cornerback for the Green Bay Packers of the National Football League (NFL).  He played college football at West Virginia, and was drafted by the Philadelphia Eagles in the third round of the 2017 NFL Draft. He has also been a member of the Carolina Panthers, Las Vegas Raiders, Houston Texans, and Arizona Cardinals.

Personal life
Douglas grew up in East Orange, New Jersey, where he and his six other siblings were raised by his grandmother, and attended East Orange Campus High School. Douglas welcomed his first child, son Jeremiah Lusar Douglas, with his girlfriend Ny-Asia Franklin on October 2, 2018.

College career
Douglas started his college career at Nassau Community College. After redshirting in 2012, he recorded 83 tackles and five interceptions over the 2013 and 2014 seasons. In 2015, he transferred to West Virginia University. During his first season at West Virginia, he appeared in 11 games and recorded seven tackles and an interception. As a senior in 2016, Douglas was named first-team All-Big 12 after he tied for the nation lead with eight interceptions. He also had 70 tackles and a sack.

Professional career
Coming out of West Virginia, Douglas was projected to be a third to fifth round pick from the majority of NFL draft experts and analysts. He received an invitation to the NFL combine and completed all of the required combine and positional drills. On March 31, 2017, Douglas participated at West Virginia's pro day and opted to run the 40, 20, and 10-yard dash once again while also performing positional drills. Team representatives and scouts from all 32 NFL teams attended to scout Douglas, K. J. Dillon, Shelton Gibson, Tyler Orlosky, and 14 other prospects. He was ranked the 19th best cornerback prospect in the draft by NFLDraftScout.com.

Philadelphia Eagles

The Philadelphia Eagles selected Douglas in the third round (99th overall) of the 2017 NFL Draft. He was the 17th cornerback selected in the draft and the second cornerback taken by the Eagles after they selected Sidney Jones in the second round (42nd overall).

He competed with Patrick Robinson, Jalen Mills, Ron Brooks, Ronald Darby, Jaylen Watkins, Aaron Grymes, and Sidney Jones throughout training camp for the starting cornerback position. Head coach Doug Pederson named him the fourth cornerback on the Eagles' depth chart to start the regular season, behind Ronald Darby, Jalen Mills, and Patrick Robinson.

Douglas was inactive for the Philadelphia Eagles' season-opening 30–17 victory over the Washington Redskins. During the second quarter, starting cornerback Ronald Darby dislocated his ankle, sidelining him for 4–6 weeks. On September 17, 2017, Douglas made his professional regular season debut against the Kansas City Chiefs and finished with four solo tackles and a pass deflection in the 20–27 loss. The following week, he earned his first career start in place of Ronald Darby and recorded four combined tackles, defended a pass, and made his first career interception after picking off a pass from New York Giants' quarterback Eli Manning during the 27–24 victory. Douglas finished his rookie season with 25 tackles, 2 interceptions, and 11 passes defended. The Eagles went on to win Super Bowl LII 41–33 against the New England Patriots. Pro Football Focus gave Douglas an overall grade of 61.2, which ranked 87th among all qualifying cornerbacks in 2017.

On September 5, 2020, Douglas was waived during final roster cuts.

Carolina Panthers
On September 6, 2020, Douglas was claimed off waivers by the Carolina Panthers. He was placed on the reserve/COVID-19 list by the team on October 23, and activated on November 2.

Las Vegas Raiders
Douglas signed with the Las Vegas Raiders on April 19, 2021. He was released on August 23, 2021.

Houston Texans
On August 25, 2021, Douglas was signed by the Houston Texans. He was released on August 31, 2021.

Arizona Cardinals
On September 3, 2021, Douglas was signed to the Arizona Cardinals practice squad.

Green Bay Packers
The Green Bay Packers signed Douglas off the Cardinals' practice squad on October 6, 2021, following injuries to starting cornerbacks Jaire Alexander and Kevin King. Douglas replaced backup cornerback Isaac Yiadom in a Week 6 match up vs the Chicago Bears after Yiadom committed a pass interference penalty on the opening drive. On October 28, 2021, Douglas intercepted a Kyler Murray pass during the final seconds of a close game against the Arizona Cardinals, sealing a 24–21 win for the Packers.

King returned from injury in Week 9 against the Kansas City Chiefs in relief of starting cornerback Eric Stokes, who was injured during warmups. Stokes recovered in time for the Packers' Week 10 matchup against the Seattle Seahawks, and defensive coordinator Joe Barry named Douglas and Stokes as the starters at outside cornerback, supplanting King.

On November 28, 2021, Douglas intercepted a pass from Matthew Stafford and returned it 33 yards for his first career defensive touchdown in a 36–28 win over the Los Angeles Rams. For his performance, Douglas received his first NFC Defensive Player of the Week honor.
On December 12, 2021, Douglas recorded his second interception return for a touchdown after intercepting Chicago Bears quarterback Justin Fields en route to a 45–30 victory. In a 24–22 Christmas Day victory over the Cleveland Browns, Douglas was responsible for two of Browns quarterback Baker Mayfield's four interceptions, including one with the Browns driving for a potential game-winning drive with under a minute to play. For his play during the season, Douglas was named a Pro Bowl alternate for the first time in his career.

On March 19, 2022, Douglas signed a three-year, $21 million extension with the Packers.

NFL career statistics

Regular season

Postseason

References

External links
Green Bay Packers bio
West Virginia Mountaineers bio

1995 births
Living people
Sportspeople from East Orange, New Jersey
Players of American football from New Jersey
American football cornerbacks
Nassau Lions football players
West Virginia Mountaineers football players
Philadelphia Eagles players
Carolina Panthers players
Las Vegas Raiders players
Houston Texans players
Arizona Cardinals players
Green Bay Packers players